Coleophora cormicola is a moth of the family Coleophoridae.

The larvae feed on Caroxylon dendroides and Caroxylon orientale. They feed on the shoots of their host plant.

References

cormicola
Moths described in 1989